Dactyloscopus moorei, the speckled stargazer, is a species of sand stargazer native to the Atlantic and Gulf coasts of the United States from North Carolina to Texas where it can be found on sandy bottoms at depths of from .  This species can reach a length of  TL. The specific name honours the American archaeologist Clarence Bloomfield Moore (1852-1936).

References

moorei
Taxa named by Henry Weed Fowler
Fish described in 1906